Robert Piet Houwer (born 13 December 1937) is a Dutch film producer. He studied at the University of Television and Film Munich, Germany. In 1964 he directed the short film Anmeldung (Declaration) which was awarded a Silver Bear at the Berlin Filmfest. During the 1960s, Rob Houwer became one of the most prolific producers in Germany, with directors Volker Schlöndorff (A Degree of Murder, Man on Horseback), Peter Fleischmann (Hunting Scenes from Bavaria), Johannes Schaaf (Tattoo), Michael Verhoeven (Up the Establishment, o.k.) and Hans-Jürgen Syberberg (Romy: Anatomy of a Face). Upon his return to the Netherlands in 1971, he frequently collaborated with Paul Verhoeven and produced most of his Dutch films. Turkish Delight (1973), based on the novel by Jan Wolkers, became the most frequently visited film in Dutch cinema and still holds that place today.  The relationship between Houwer and Verhoeven ended when Verhoeven moved to the US in 1985. Houwer's later films did not always enjoy the huge commercial success of his early productions. The Dragon That Wasn't (Or Was He?), supervised by Houwer and artist Marten Toonder became the All-Time Number One Dutch animated feature at the box office. Some of his later productions were considered to be among the worst in Dutch cinema by critics: De gulle Minnaar (1990), De Zeemeerman (1996) and Het woeden der gehele wereld (2006). He was appointed the Order of Orange-Nassau.

Awards
1999 Bavarian Film Awards, Best Production

Selected filmography
West Germany
Romy: Anatomy of a Face (dir. Hans-Jürgen Syberberg, 1967)
A Degree of Murder (dir. Volker Schlöndorff, 1967)
Tattoo (dir. Johannes Schaaf, 1967)
 (dir. , 1968)
Lebeck (dir. Johannes Schaaf, 1968)
Hunting Scenes from Bavaria (dir. Peter Fleischmann, 1969)
Up the Establishment (dir. Michael Verhoeven, 1969)
Man on Horseback (dir. Volker Schlöndorff, 1969)
Student of the Bedroom (dir. Michael Verhoeven, 1970)
o.k. (dir. Michael Verhoeven, 1970)

Netherlands
Business Is Business (dir. Paul Verhoeven, 1971)
Turkish Delight (dir. Paul Verhoeven, 1973)
Keetje Tippel (dir. Paul Verhoeven, 1975)
Soldier of Orange (dir. Paul Verhoeven, 1977)
Grijpstra & De Gier (dir. Wim Verstappen, 1979)
The Dragon That Wasn't (Or Was He?) (animated film, 1983)
The Fourth Man (dir. Paul Verhoeven, 1983)
Brandende liefde (dir. Ate de Jong, 1983)
Count Your Blessings (dir. Pieter Verhoeff, 1987)
De Gulle Minnaar (dir. Mady Saks, 1990)
The Little Blonde Death (dir. Jean van de Velde, 1993)
De Zeemeerman (dir. Frank Herrebout, 1996)
Bigger than James Dean (dir. Frank Krom, 2004)
Het Woeden der Gehele Wereld (dir. Guido Pieters, 2006)

References

External links

1937 births
Living people
Dutch film producers
Dutch film directors
Golden Calf winners
Mass media people from The Hague